Randy Neal (born December 29, 1972) is a former American football linebacker. He played for the Cincinnati Bengals from 1995 to 1996 and for the San Francisco 49ers in 1998.

References

1972 births
Living people
American football linebackers
Virginia Cavaliers football players
Cincinnati Bengals players
London Monarchs players
San Francisco 49ers players
Sportspeople from Hackensack, New Jersey